Tony L. Benford (born March 22, 1964) is an American basketball coach who is an assistant coach of the TCU Horned Frogs men's basketball team.

Biography
A native of Hobbs, New Mexico — and 1982 graduate of Hobbs High School — Benford played under coach Ralph Tasker. Benford is married with four children. He attended Texas Tech University, where he played on the Red Raiders basketball team for head coach Gerald Myers. While Benford played for Texas Tech, the 1984–85 Red Raiders team won both the Southwest Conference (SWC) regular season title and SWC Classic. The 1985–86 Red Raiders team won the SWC Classic, and Benford was named "Most Outstanding Player" in the conference tournament. Benford was drafted by the Boston Celtics in the fourth round of the 1986 NBA draft before playing in the Dutch Basketball League.

Coaching career

Head coaching career
North TexasOn April 24, 2012, Benford was named men's basketball head coach of the North Texas Mean Green. During his tenure at North Texas, he coached the team to a 62–95 overall record and 30–60 conference record. He was relieved of those duties March 5, 2017.

LSUOn March 8, 2019, Benford was named interim head coach of the LSU Tigers following the suspension of head coach Will Wade. He coached LSU for the last regular season game of the 2018–19 season, 2019 SEC men's basketball tournament and 2019 NCAA Division I men's basketball tournament. As interim head coach, Benford coached LSU to an overall 3–2 record. He went 1–0 in the regular season, 0–1 in the SEC Tournament and 2–1 in the NCAA Division I Tournament earning a berth in the Sweet Sixteen. On April 14, 2019, Will Wade was re-instated as head coach of LSU.

Assistant coaching career
Benford's first coaching experience was as an assistant with the New Mexico Lobos. Later he served as an assistant with the Arizona State Sun Devils and the Nebraska Cornhuskers before joining the Marquette Golden Eagles men's basketball team in 2008 as an assistant coach under Buzz Williams. Benford was promoted to associate head coach at Marquette for the 2011–12 season.

In 2017, Benford became an assistant coach under Will Wade at LSU for the 2017–18 season. Benford was named interim head coach at LSU towards the end of the 2018–19 season. On April 14, 2019, he returned to his duties as assistant coach at LSU under Will Wade. On April 24, 2019, Benford accepted an assistant coaching position at TCU.

Head coaching record

References

External links
LSU Tigers bio

1964 births
Living people
American expatriate basketball people in the Netherlands
American men's basketball coaches
American men's basketball players
Arizona State Sun Devils men's basketball coaches
Basketball coaches from New Mexico
Basketball players from New Mexico
Boston Celtics draft picks
Hobbs High School alumni
LSU Tigers basketball coaches
Marquette Golden Eagles men's basketball coaches
Nebraska Cornhuskers men's basketball coaches
New Mexico Lobos men's basketball coaches
North Texas Mean Green men's basketball coaches
TCU Horned Frogs men's basketball coaches
Texas Tech Red Raiders basketball players